Loich is a town in the district of Sankt Pölten-Land in the Austrian state of Lower Austria.

Population 

is slowly decsingrin this area ea due to the missing job opportunities and large distances Austrias major cities ng.

Population

References

Cities and towns in St. Pölten-Land District